Kauxwi is a village in North-West District of Botswana. According to the village elders, the village was formally established in 1983. It is located close to the Namibian border and has both primary and secondary schools. The population was 859 in the 2001 census. The village is a residence for Hambukushu, Basarwa and Haxhiriku. The village has a clinic and a tribal court. The headman of records is Mr. Simon Kambango. The village consist of 7 wards which are Mohembo, Gcarikwe, Modubana, Kehemo, Divava, Kaputura and Gowa. The people are mostly arable and pastoral farmers at a small scale.

North-West District (Botswana)
Villages in Botswana